Łowęcice may refer to the following places in Poland:
Łowęcice, Lower Silesian Voivodeship (south-west Poland)
Łowęcice, Greater Poland Voivodeship (west-central Poland)